The Reiten Boatyard was located in Bayfield, Wisconsin.

History
The Reiten Boatyard was a marina and a boatyard for boats and other aquatic equipment. It was added to the National Register of Historic Places in 1982. However, it was removed after it was demolished in 1984.

References

Transportation buildings and structures on the National Register of Historic Places in Wisconsin
National Register of Historic Places in Bayfield County, Wisconsin
Marinas in the United States
Buildings and structures completed in 1909
Buildings and structures demolished in 1984
1909 establishments in Wisconsin
1984 disestablishments in Wisconsin

Former National Register of Historic Places in Wisconsin